Bryce Hall (born November 5, 1997) is an American football cornerback for the New York Jets of the National Football League (NFL). He played college football at Virginia.

High school career
Playing at Bishop McDevitt High School in Harrisburg, Pennsylvania, Hall played mostly wide receiver but was also sparingly used in the defensive backfield. He was rated as a two-star prospect, and chose Virginia over only one other FBS scholarship offer, Coastal Carolina. He originally committed to UVA as an athlete, with more accolades on the offensive side of the ball.

College career
Receiving playing time as a true freshman in 2016, Hall became a starter in the defensive lineup after switching from wide receiver to cornerback. He continued to build during his sophomore season, starting every game.

Hall led all collegiate players in pass breakups his junior year, and he explored the possibility of entering the 2019 NFL Draft, even getting a grade from the NFL's Draft Advisory Board. After Virginia beat South Carolina in the 2018 Belk Bowl, Hall announced that he would return to UVA for his senior year. Mock drafts for 2019 had Hall going as high as the first round. Despite earning first-team All-Atlantic Coast Conference and second-team All-American honors after his junior year, Hall cited a desire to improve himself and the Cavalier program as a main reason to stay for his senior season.

Preliminary mock drafts before the 2019 season projected Hall as a first-round prospect in the 2020 NFL Draft.

On October 12, 2019, in Virginia's sixth game of the season, Hall suffered an ankle injury in the second quarter against Miami which required surgery, effectively ending his senior season and collegiate career.

Professional career

Hall was selected in the fifth round of the 2020 NFL Draft with the 158th pick by the New York Jets. He was placed on the reserve/COVID-19 list by the Jets on July 28, 2020. He was activated on August 27, 2020, and placed on the active/non-football injury list. He was placed on reserve/non-football injury on September 5, 2020. He was activated on November 9, 2020.
In Week 15 against the Los Angeles Rams, Hall recorded his first career interception off a pass thrown by Jared Goff during the 23–20 win.

References

External links
 Virginia Cavaliers biography

1997 births
Living people
Players of American football from Harrisburg, Pennsylvania
American football cornerbacks
Virginia Cavaliers football players
New York Jets players